The Communauté d'agglomération du Bassin d'Aurillac (CABA) is the communauté d'agglomération, an intercommunal structure, centred on the city of Aurillac. It is located in the Cantal department, in the Auvergne-Rhône-Alpes region, south-central France. It was created in 1999 and came into effect on 1 January 2000. Its area is 491.9 km2. Its population was 53,247 in 2018, including 25,531 in Aurillac proper.

Composition
The CABA consists of 25 communes: 

Arpajon-sur-Cère
Aurillac
Ayrens
Carlat
Crandelles
Giou-de-Mamou
Jussac
Labrousse
Lacapelle-Viescamp
Laroquevieille
Lascelle
Mandailles-Saint-Julien
Marmanhac
Naucelles
Reilhac
Saint-Cirgues-de-Jordanne
Saint-Paul-des-Landes
Saint-Simon
Sansac-de-Marmiesse
Teissières-de-Cornet
Velzic
Vézac
Vezels-Roussy
Yolet
Ytrac

Administration

Administrative seat 
The administrative seat of the CA du Bassin d'Aurillac is located on Place des Carmes in Aurillac.

Elected members 
Since the re-election of municipal councils in March 2020, the Council of Communities of the CA du Bassin d'Aurillac has been composed of 68 elected councilors representing each of the member communes for a period of six years. They are distributed as follows:

Presidency

Jurisdiction 
The CABA has for mandatory areas of jurisdiction:
 Economic development
 Land management
 Environmental protection
 Town political structures

It is to oversee as well:
 Organization of common transport problems
 Sanitation collection and treatment
 Assessment, protection, and economic impact of the local environment
 The creation, management and assessment of cultural and sporting organizations across the communes

Activities of the CABA 
Areas over which the CABA has shared jurisdiction:
 Airports
 Fisheries and shellfish cultivation
 Vineyard cultivation
 Wine and spirits production
 Thermal energy production
 Tourism

See also 

 List of intercommunalities of the Cantal department

References

External links 
 CABA

Bassin d'Aurillac
Basin d'Aurillac